The Auckland Islands (Māori: Motu Maha "Many islands" or Maungahuka "Snowy mountains") are an archipelago of New Zealand, lying  south of the South Island. The islands have no permanent human inhabitants.

The islands are listed with the New Zealand Outlying Islands. The islands are an immediate part of New Zealand, but not part of any region or district, but instead Area Outside Territorial Authority, like all the other outlying islands except the Solander Islands.

Ecologically, the Auckland Islands form part of the Antipodes Subantarctic Islands tundra ecoregion. Along with other New Zealand Sub-Antarctic Islands, they were designated a UNESCO World Heritage Site in 1998.

Geography

The islands are close to each other, separated by narrow channels, and the coastline is rugged, with numerous deep inlets.

Prominent peaks include Cavern Peak, Mount Raynal, Mount D'Urville, Mount Easton, and the Tower of Babel.

The channel is the remains of the crater of an extinct volcano, and Adams Island and the southern part of the main island form the crater rim. The main island features many sharply incised inlets, notably Port Ross at the northern end.

Most of the islands have a volcanic origin, with the archipelago dominated by two 12-million-year-old Miocene shield volcanoes, subsequently eroded and dissected. These rest on older volcanic rocks 15–25 million years old with some older granites and fossil-bearing sedimentary rocks from around 100 million years ago.

Climate 
Port Ross features a subpolar oceanic climate (Cfc according to the Köppen climate classification system). Like many other Subpolar oceanic climates, Port Ross, along with the Auckland Islands in general, are characterised by the near-constant overcast weather and never being too hot or too cold.

Carnley Harbour also features a subpolar oceanic climate (Cfc according to the Köppen climate classification system), though it exaggerates the features shown in Port Ross, as it is much wetter and a lot more affected by ocean-moderation.

The Auckland Islands have a fairly constant cool and wet weather year-round, with neither winter being excessively cold nor summer excessively hot. The climate is most similar to that seen in the Faroe Islands and Aleutian Islands.

History

Discovery and early exploitation 
Evidence exists that Polynesian voyagers first discovered the Auckland Islands. Traces of Polynesian settlement, possibly dating to the 13th century, have been found by archaeologists on Enderby Island. This is the most southerly settlement by Polynesians yet known.

The whaler  discovered the islands in 1806, finding them uninhabited.
Captain Abraham Bristow named them "Lord Auckland's" on 18 August 1806 in honour of his father's friend William Eden, 1st Baron Auckland. Bristow worked for the businessman Samuel Enderby, the namesake of Enderby Island. The explorers Dumont D'Urville and James Clark Ross visited in 1839 and in 1840 respectively.

Whalers and sealers set up temporary bases, the islands becoming one of the principal sealing stations in the Pacific in the years immediately after their discovery. By 1812, so many seals had been killed that the islands lost their commercial importance and sealers redirected their efforts towards Campbell and Macquarie Islands. Visits to the islands declined, although recovering seal populations allowed a modest revival in sealing in the mid-1820s.

The sealing era lasted from 1807 till 1894, during which time 82 vessels are recorded as visiting for sealing purposes. Some 11 of these ships were wrecked off-shore. Relics of the sealing period include inscriptions, the remains of huts, and graves.

Settlement 

Now uninhabited, the islands saw unsuccessful settlements in the mid-19th century. In 1842, a small party of 70 Māori and their Moriori slaves from the Chatham Islands migrated to the archipelago, surviving for about 20 years or so  on sealing and flax growing. Samuel Enderby's grandson, Charles Enderby, proposed a community based on agriculture and whaling in 1846. This settlement, established at Port Ross in 1849 and named Hardwicke, lasted only two and a half years. Māori and Moriori settlement continued until 1866, when most of the Māori and some of the Moriori returned to the Chatham Islands; however, most of the Moriori settled on Rakiura, where some of their descendants continue to live today.

The Auckland Islands were part of the Colony of New Zealand under the Letters Patent of April 1842, which fixed the southern boundary of New Zealand at 53° south, but they were then excluded by the New Zealand Constitution Act 1846, which defined the southern boundary at 47° 10' south; however, they were again included by the New Zealand Boundaries Act of 1863, an act of the Imperial Parliament at Westminster that extended the boundaries of the colony once more.

Shipwrecks 

The rocky coasts of the islands have proven disastrous for several ships. The , captained by Thomas Musgrave, was wrecked in Carnley Harbour in 1864. Madelene Ferguson Allen's narrative about her great-grandfather, Robert Holding, and the wreck of the Scottish sailing ship , wrecked in the Auckland Islands a few months later in 1864, counterpoints the Grafton story. François Édouard Raynal wrote Wrecked on a Reef.

In 1866, one of New Zealand's most famous shipwrecks, that of the General Grant, occurred on the western coast. Ten survivors waited for rescue on Auckland Island for 18 months. Several attempts have failed to salvage its cargo, allegedly including bullion.

Because of the probability of wrecks around the islands, calls arose for the establishment of emergency depots for castaways in 1868. The New Zealand authorities established and maintained three such depots, at Port Ross, Norman Inlet and Carnley Harbour from 1887. They also cached additional supplies, including boats (to help reach the depots) and 40 finger-posts (which had smaller amounts of supplies), around the islands.

The 15 survivors lived off the supplies in the Auckland Island depot.

In 2019, a helicopter with three passengers crashed into the ocean near Enderby Island, when they were en route to uplift an ill man on a fishing trawler. The three passengers survived the crash, and were found the next day with only minor injuries. The rescue effort was led by Richard Hayes.

Scientific research and reserve 
The Sub-Antarctic Islands Scientific Expedition of 1907 spent 10 days on the islands conducting a magnetic survey and taking botanical, zoological and geological specimens.

From 1941 to 1945, the islands hosted a New Zealand meteorological station as part of a coastwatching programme staffed by scientist volunteers and known for security reasons as the "Cape Expedition". The staff included Robert Falla, later an eminent New Zealand scientist.  the islands have no inhabitants, although scientists visit regularly and the authorities allow limited tourism on Enderby Island and Auckland Island.

The Subantarctic Islands marine reserves around the Auckland, Antipodes, Bounty and Campbell Islands combined form the largest natural sanctuary in New Zealand.

Ecology

Plants 

The botany of the islands was first described in the Flora of Lord Auckland and Campbell's Islands, a product of the Ross expedition of 1839–43, written by Joseph Dalton Hooker and published by Reeve Brothers in London between 1843 and 1845.

The vegetation of the islands sub-divides into distinct altitudinal zones. Inland from the salt-spray zone, the fringes of the islands predominantly feature forests of southern rata Metrosideros umbellata, and in places the subantarctic tree daisy (Olearia lyallii), probably introduced by sealers. Above this exists a subalpine shrub zone dominated by Dracophyllum, Coprosma and Myrsine (with some rata). At higher elevations tussock grass and megaherb communities dominate the flora.

Invertebrates 
The islands host the largest communities of subantarctic invertebrates, with 24 species of spider, 11 species of springtail and over 200 insects. These include 57 species of beetle, 110 flies and 39 moths. The islands also boast an endemic genus and species of wētā, Dendroplectron aucklandensis.

Fresh and saltwater fauna 
The freshwater environments of the islands host a freshwater fish, the kōaro or climbing galaxias, which lives in saltwater as a juvenile but which returns to the rivers as an adult. The islands have 19 species of endemic freshwater invertebrates, including one mollusc, one crustacean, a mayfly, 12 flies and two caddisflies. The Auckland Islands cockle is endemic to the islands.

Marine mammals 
There are two species of seal which haul out on the islands, the New Zealand fur seal and the threatened New Zealand sea lion. Southern elephant seals are frequent migrants in winter, and leopard seals may also appear.

A well-recovering population in excess of 2,000 southern right whales is found off the islands, and Port Ross area is considered to be the most important and well-established congregating ground for whales in New Zealand waters. Its importance exceeds the Campbell Island ground.

Birds 
The islands hold important seabird breeding colonies, among them albatrosses, penguins and several small petrels, with a million pairs of sooty shearwater.  Landbirds include red-fronted and yellow-crowned parakeet, New Zealand falcon, tui, bellbirds, pipits, and an endemic subspecies of tomtit.

The whole Auckland Island group has been identified as an Important Bird Area (IBA) by BirdLife International because of its significance as a breeding site for several species of seabirds as well as the endemic Auckland shag, Auckland teal, Auckland rail, and Auckland snipe.  The seabirds include southern rockhopper and yellow-eyed penguins; Antipodean, southern royal, light-mantled and white-capped albatrosses; and white-chinned petrel.

Ecological history 
Several introduced species have come to the islands; goats, other useful animals and seed were brought to the islands by Captains Musgrave and Norman 1865, returning to search for castaways; ecologists eliminated or allowed to go extinct cattle, sheep, goats, dogs, possums and rabbits in the 1990s, but feral cats, pigs and mice remain on Auckland Island. The last rabbits on Enderby Island were removed in 1993 through the application of poison, also eradicating mice there. Curiously, rats have never colonised the islands, in spite of numerous visits and shipwrecks and their ubiquity on other islands. Introduced species affected the native vegetation and bird life, and caused the extinction of the New Zealand merganser, a duck formerly widespread in southern New Zealand, and ultimately confined to the islands.

The New Zealand Department of Conservation plans to remove the last remaining introduced mammals from Auckland Island, making the entire island group pest-free, in what would be one of the largest multi-species eradication plans in the world. This project started in November 2018, with NZ$2 million of initial scoping work. The total cost for the eradication could stretch to NZ$40–50 million over 10 years.

List of endemic species 
Auckland Islands cockle
Auckland Island wētā
Auckland Islands shore plover (extinct)
Auckland rail
Auckland teal
Auckland snipe
Gentianella concinna

Legal status 
The Auckland Islands – as with all of New Zealand's subantarctic islands – is a National Nature Reserve, afforded the highest possible level of protection under New Zealand law. In addition, a marine reserve encompasses all of the Auckland Islands territorial sea and internal waterways.

All of New Zealand's subantarctic islands are managed by the Southland Conservancy of the Department of Conservation (DOC). Expedition party size, length of stay and landing on the islands are kept to a minimum. Entry is by permit only and applicants must undergo thorough pre-expedition quarantine checks.

When Andrew Fagan made a solo voyage there in a  plywood yacht (and nearly added to the shipwreck tally), he described the DOC permitting process thus:

See also 

 Composite Gazetteer of Antarctica
 Scientific Committee on Antarctic Research
 Territorial claims in Antarctica
 New Zealand Subantarctic Islands
 List of Antarctic and subantarctic islands
 List of islands of New Zealand

References

Further reading 
 Wise's New Zealand Guide (4th ed.) (1969). Dunedin: H. Wise & Co. (N.Z.) Ltd.
 Appendix to the Journals of the House of Representatives of New Zealand (1863, Session III Oct–Dec) (A5)
 Island of the Lost: Shipwrecked At the Edge of the World (2007) by Joan Druett – an account of the Grafton and Invercauld wrecks
 Sub Antarctic New Zealand: A Rare Heritage by Neville Peat – the Department of Conservation guide to the islands
Lost Gold : Ornithology of the subantarctic Auckland Islands. (2020) by Colin Miskelly. Wellington: Te Papa Press. OCLC 1141973732

External links 

Auckland Islands Marine Reserve (New Zealand Department of Conservation)
 High Resolution Map
 Murihiku.com
 A Map of the Islands
 Island Information 
 Historical Timeline of the Auckland Islands (abandoned website, archived (abandoned website, archived by the Wayback Machine.
 Diary of a 1962–63 biological visit by E. J. Fisher
 1948 article on Auckland Islands Coleoptera by E. S. Gourlay
 Islas Auckland – El archipiélago de los naufragios (in Spanish)

 
New Zealand subantarctic islands
Archipelagoes of New Zealand
Archipelagoes of the Southern Ocean
Volcanic islands of New Zealand
Volcanoes of the New Zealand outlying islands
Important Bird Areas of the Auckland Islands
Moriori
Miocene shield volcanoes
Miocene Oceania
Submarine calderas
Subantarctic islands
Uninhabited islands of New Zealand
Former British colonies and protectorates in Oceania
Seal hunting
Whaling stations in New Zealand
Endemic Bird Areas